The 1978 Virginia Slims of Dallas was a women's tennis tournament played on indoor carpet courts at the Moody Coliseum in Dallas, Texas that was part of the 1978 Virginia Slims World Championship Series. It was the seventh edition of the tournament, held from March 6 through March 12, 1978. Second-seeded Evonne Goolagong Cawley won the singles title and earned $20,000 first-prize money.

Finals

Singles
 Evonne Goolagong Cawley defeated  Tracy Austin 4–6, 6–0, 6–2

Doubles
 Martina Navratilova /  Anne Smith defeated  Evonne Goolagong Cawley /  Betty Stöve 6–3, 7–6(5–2)

Prize money

References

External links
 Women's Tennis Association (WTA) tournament details

Virginia Slims of Dallas
Virginia Slims of Dallas
Virginia Slims of Dallas
Dallas
Dallas
Virginia Slims of Dallas